Camel loin is a cut of meat from a camel, created from the tissue along the dorsal side of the rib cage.

The brisket, ribs and loin are among the preferred parts. The method of cooking varies from country to country; the Saudis prefer to cook the kabsa by using pressure cooking.

See also

 Cuts of camel

References

Cuts of camel